Ninagoskara is a 2002 Indian Kannada-language comedy film directed by Yogish Hunsur, starring Darshan and Ruchita.

Plot 

The plot is taken from the English movie of 1997, Addicted To Love, casting Megan Ryan.
Manoj and Apoorva are two individuals who are betrayed by their respected lovers Varsha and Jay. After several years, Jay and Varsha are married and live in a posh locality. Coincidentally, Manoj and Apurva meet up and plan to shift next to the married couple. Somehow, they bug the couple's room with cameras to spy on them. In this process, Manoj starts developing a soft corner for Apurva.

Cast 
 Darshan as Manoj
 Bhavna Pani as Apoorva
 Ruchita Prasad as Varsha 
 Naveen Mayur as Jay
 Komal as thief
 Bullet Prakash as supari killer
 Sanketh Kashi as Kannada, landlord 
 Sunetra Pandit as Kannada's wife
 Ramesh Bhat
 Chitra Shenoy

Soundtrack
The music was composed by L. N. Shastri and released by Jhankar Music.

References

External links

Review by Viggy (in Kannada)

2000s Kannada-language films